Hoseynabad (also Romanized as Ḩoseynābād and Hosein Abad) is a village in Allahabad Rural District, Zarach District, Yazd County, Yazd Province, Iran. At the 2006 census, its population was 22, in 10 families.

References 

Populated places in Yazd County